Amjhupi Union is a union parishad situated at Meherpur Sadar Upazila,  in Meherpur District, Khulna Division of Bangladesh. There are 20 villages and 15 mouzas in the union.

References

External links
 

Unions of Meherpur Sadar Upazila
Unions of Meherpur District
Unions of Khulna Division